Christian Eggert (born 16 January 1986) is a German footballer who plays for Westfalia Herne in the Oberliga Westfalen.

Career
Eggert was born in Herne, West Germany. He began his career with SC Pantringshof and was scouted later from FC Schalke 04. After few years with FC Schalke 04 he moved to rival Rot-Weiss Essen until 2005 when he joined Borussia Dortmund II. In summer 2006, Eggert transferred to FSV Frankfurt, but played here mainly for the reserve team. After his release from FSV Frankfurt he returned to Borussia Dortmund II and signed a one-year contract. In 2011, he signed for 1. FC Saarbrücken, where he spent three years, leaving at the end of the 2013–14 season after the club were relegated from the 3. Liga. He signed for SV Elversberg, another Saarland club that had been relegated from the 3. Liga, joining along with his FCS team-mate Kevin Maek.

Career statistics

Honours
 DFB-Pokal finalist: 2007–08

References

External links
 

1986 births
Living people
German footballers
Bundesliga players
2. Bundesliga players
3. Liga players
Regionalliga players
Oberliga (football) players
Rot-Weiss Essen players
Borussia Dortmund players
Borussia Dortmund II players
1. FC Saarbrücken players
FSV Frankfurt players
SV Elversberg players
SC Westfalia Herne players
People from Herne, North Rhine-Westphalia
Sportspeople from Arnsberg (region)
Association football midfielders
Footballers from North Rhine-Westphalia